Seyf ol Din or Seyf od Din or Seyf ed Din may refer to various places in Iran:
 Seyf ol Din Kuh, East Azerbaijan Province
 Seyf ol Din Rud, East Azerbaijan Province
 Seyf ol Din, Baft, Kerman Province
 Seyf ol Din, Rigan, Kerman Province
 Seyf ol Din-e Olya, West Azerbaijan Province
 Seyf ol Din-e Sofla, West Azerbaijan Province
 Seyf ol Din, Yazd